Edward Bazalgette is a British television director and former musician.

Biography
Bazalgette was the lead guitarist in the 1980s rock group The Vapors, whose hit "Turning Japanese" remains a popular one-hit wonder. He later became a film editor, television producer and director. In 2003, the BBC commissioned a seven part series of documentaries called The Seven Wonders of the Industrial World. Edward Bazalgette directed and produced the documentary The Sewer King which charted his great-great-grandfather Sir Joseph Bazalgette's design and engineering of the London sewers. His third cousin Peter Bazalgette later presented a show for Five called The Great Stink.

He has also directed two drama documentaries for the BBC, Genghis Khan (2005) and Hannibal (2006). He has also directed episodes of EastEnders and Holby City, as well as location films for Top Gear. In 2013, he directed The Guilty and one episode of the first series of Endeavour, and in 2014 directed Poldark with Will McGregor.

In 2015, he directed two episodes of the ninth series of Doctor Who ("The Girl Who Died" and "The Woman Who Lived") as well as "The Doctor's Meditation", a prequel for the series. He also directed the 2016 Christmas special of Doctor Who, "The Return of Doctor Mysterio". In addition, he directed the first three episodes of the Doctor Who spinoff  Class in 2016.

In 2019 he directed four episodes of the historical drama The Last Kingdom, based on the book series by Bernard Cornwell.

In 2021, Bazalgette directed two episodes of The Witcher.

References

External links

Trailer for Poldark 2015
Guardian article on The Guilty

Living people
British television producers
British television directors
British rock guitarists
British male guitarists
1960 births